Cyrtolaelaps is a genus of mites in the family Ologamasidae. There are about 11 described species in Cyrtolaelaps.

Species
These 12 species belong to the genus Cyrtolaelaps:
 Cyrtolaelaps aster (Berlese, 1918)
 Cyrtolaelaps berlesei Chelebiev, 1984
 Cyrtolaelaps chiropterae Karg, 1971
 Cyrtolaelaps gracilipes Banks, 1916
 Cyrtolaelaps kasakstanicus (Chelebiev, 1978)
 Cyrtolaelaps minor Willmann, 1952
 Cyrtolaelaps mucronatus (Canestrini & Canestrini, 1881)
 Cyrtolaelaps paraster Costa, 1961
 Cyrtolaelaps qinghaiensis Ma, 1988
 Cyrtolaelaps rectus (Berlese, 1920)
 Cyrtolaelaps spurius (Holzmann, 1969)
 Cyrtolaelaps subnudus (Berlese, 1918)

References

Ologamasidae
Articles created by Qbugbot